Daly City station is an elevated Bay Area Rapid Transit (BART) station in Daly City, California, just south of the city limits of San Francisco. It is adjacent to Interstate 280 and California Route 1, which it serves as a park-and-ride station.

From its November 5, 1973 opening until the extension to Colma station in 1996, Daly City was the southern terminus of BART on the Peninsula and the only station that was not in one of the three base counties of San Francisco, Alameda and Contra Costa. It still serves as the terminus for some services that do not continue to the other San Mateo County stations.

Station layout

The station has three tracks with an island platform between the east tracks and a side platform next to the west track. The side platform is used primarily by southbound trains continuing on to SFO Airport or Millbrae. The island platform is used primarily by northbound trains and by southbound trains terminating at the station. Southbound trains terminating at Daly City reverse their direction to make the return trip to San Francisco and the East Bay, unless they are going out of service at the rail yard in Colma.

Bus connections

Daly City station is served by a number of SamTrans and Muni bus routes. Most routes use the Niantic Avenue busway on the east side of the station; Muni route 54 and the shuttle routes stop on the west side of the station.
Commute.org: Daly City Bayshore

San Francisco State University operates the free Daly City BART Express Shuttle, stopping on the west side of the station. Its Campus Loop shuttle also serves Daly City station on a limited number of trips. Seton Medical Center and Skyline College also operate a free shuttles to the station.

References

External links

BART - Daly City

Bay Area Rapid Transit stations in San Mateo County, California
Stations on the Yellow Line (BART)
Stations on the Green Line (BART)
Stations on the Red Line (BART)
Stations on the Blue Line (BART)
Railway stations in the United States opened in 1973
Bus stations in San Mateo County, California
1973 establishments in California